The 2022 SAFF Women's Championship was the 6th edition of the SAFF Women's Championship, the international women's football championship contested by the national teams of the South Asian Football Federation (SAFF). The tournament were played from 6–19 September 2022 in Kathmandu, Nepal.

In the final, Bangladesh played Nepal on 19 September 2022 at the Dasharath Rangasala Stadium in Kathmandu. Bangladesh won the final match 3–1, claiming their first SAFF title. Bangladeshi player Sabina Khatun was the tournament's best player, winning the Most Valuable Player award. Also, Sabina Khatun won the Top scorer(s) award as she scored the most goals during the tournament with eight. Bangladesh's Rupna Chakma won the Best Goalkeeper award with four clean sheets, awarded to the goalkeeper with the most clean sheets.

Participating teams
Apart from the hosts, Nepal, six other South Asian teams participated in the tournament. Pakistan would participate in the tournament after two season.

Venue
Nepal was confirmed as the host for the 2022 SAFF Women’s Championship at the SAFF Ordinary Congress on 2 July 2022.

Match officials
Referees

 Jaya Chakma
 Om Choki
 Ranjita Devi Tekcham
 Anjana Rai
 Pabasara Minisarani

Assistant Referees

 Salma Akter Moni
 Choden Tshering
 Riiohlang Dhar
 Radhika Shakya
 Malika Madhushani

Group stage

All matches were played at Nepal.
Times listed are UTC+05:45.

Group A

Group B

Knockout stage
Times listed are UTC+05:45.

Bracket

Semi-finals

Final

Winner

Statistics

Goalscorers

Awards
The following awards were given at the conclusion of the tournament. The Top scorers (top scorer), Most Valuable Player (best overall player) and Best Goalkeeper (goalkeeper with the most clean sheets) awards were given.

See also
 AFC
 2022 AFC Women's Asian Cup
 2022 AFF Women's Championship
 2022 CAFA Women's Championship
 2022 EAFF E-1 Football Championship (women)
 2022 WAFF Women's Championship
 SAFF
 2022 SAFF U-18 Women's Championship
 2022 SAFF U-20 Championship
 2022 SAFF U-17 Championship

References

External links

2022
2022
2022 in Asian football
2022 in Bangladeshi football
2022 in Maldivian football
September 2022 sports events in Asia
2022 in women's association football
2022 in Nepalese football